Big Mountain is an American band known for its remake of Peter Frampton's "Baby, I Love Your Way", which became a top 10 hit single in the US in early 1994, reaching No. 6 on the US Billboard Hot 100, No. 1 on the Mainstream Top 40 and No. 2 in the UK.

History
The evolution of the Big Mountain band started in 1986 as the San Diego, California reggae band Rainbow Warriors. In 1988, future Big Mountain frontman Joaquin "Quino" (pronounced Keeno) McWhinney joined as the lead singer of the band Shiloh. Quino is of Mexican/Irish heritage, and several members of his family were mariachi musicians.  His interest in reggae began after seeing a documentary about Bob Marley and Rastafari. In 1989, Shiloh secured their first record deal and put out one album titled California Reggae. In 1991, the band changed the name to Big Mountain which was the name of a Native American reservation in Arizona. The original line-up was a sextet consisting of Quino (vocals), Lynn Copeland (bass), Gregory Blakney (drums), Jerome Cruz (guitar), Manfred Reinke (keyboards), and Lance Rhodes (drums).

The band first reached the charts with the song "Touch My Light" in spring 1993, a song taken from their debut album Wake Up. Prior to the band recording their second album, Unity, in 1994, Blakney, Cruz, Reinke, and Rhodes all departed the band, with McWhinney and Copeland finding replacements in Jamaican duo Tony Chin (guitar) and Carlton "Santa" Davis (drums), along with keyboard players Michael Hyde and Billy "Bones" Stoll, and percussionist James McWhinney. Following this lineup change, the band went on to receive major airplay on mainstream radio stations. "Baby, I Love Your Way" was included on the soundtrack for the film Reality Bites, and peaked at No. 6 on the Billboard Hot 100 and No. 2 on the UK Singles Chart, and its follow-up, "Sweet Sensual Love" reached No. 51 in the UK, whilst Unity went on to sell over a million copies worldwide. Big Mountain's follow up single "Get Together" became a top five hit in Brazil and Norway.

The band appeared at both the 1994 and 1995 Reggae Sunsplash festivals in Jamaica. In 1998 Jamaican drummer/producer Paul "Groove Galore" Kastick replaced Carlton "Santa" Davis as full-time drummer and primary producer in the group. Kastick spearheaded the production on the next six Big Mountain albums, spanning from 1998 and 2007. After 10 consecutive years of touring, Big Mountain decided to take a break in 2005. During this time, Quino McWhinney started to teach at Olympian High School, which received the highest test scores on their CAHSEE exams during his tenure. During the period between 2005 and 2013, Big Mountain would occasionally reunite for primarily international live performances and various benefit causes.  In 2013, Quino, Hyde, and Kastick reformed the band with an extended lineup including Carlos Arias (bass), Richard "Goofy" Campbell (keyboards), Reggie Griffin (guitar, saxophone), Stephen Kamada (guitar), Danny Lopilato (guitar, vocals), Tim Pacheco (percussion, vocals). Further lineup changes have ensued, and the band now consists of Quino and James Mcwhinney, Paul Kastick, Goofy Campbell, Chizzy Chisholm and Michael (Mikey) Ortiz. In May 2016 the band released their first album in 14 years, Perfect Summer.

Band members

Current members
 Joaquin "Quino" McWhinney – vocals, guitar (1988–present)
 Michael Hyde – keyboards (1994–present)
 Paul "Groove-Galore" KasticK – drums (1998–present)
 Richard "Goofy" Campbell – keyboards (1999–present)
 Reggie Griffin – guitar, saxophone (2013–present)
 Danny Lopilato – guitar, vocals (2013–present)
 Andre Sias – drums (2013–present)
 Luis Castillo – percussion, vocals (2013–present)
 Jakob McWhinney – guitar (2013–present)
 Michael Ortiz – bass (2013–present)

Former members
 Lynn Copeland – bass (1988–1993)
 Gregory Blakney – drums (1988–1994)
 Jerome Cruz – guitar (1988–1993)
 Manfred Reinke – keyboards (1988–1994)
 Lance Rhodes – drums (1988–1994)
 James McWhinney – percussion, vocals (1994–2013)
 Tony Chin – guitar (1994–2013)
 "Grizzly" Richard Onslow– touring guitar (2015–2016)
 Billy "Bones" Stoll – keyboards (1994–1997)
 Carlton "Santa" Davis – drums (1994–1998)
 Carlos Arias – bass (2013)
 Stephen Kamada – guitar (2013)
 Tim Pacheco - vocals, percussion (2016)

Awards and nominations
{| class=wikitable
|-
! Year !! Awards !! Work !! Category !! Result
|-
| 1994
| MTV Europe Music Awards
| rowspan=2|"Baby I Love Your Way"
| Best Cover
| 
|-
| 1995
| Ivor Novello Awards
| Most Performed Work
|

Discography

Studio albums

Compilations
 The Best of Big Mountain (1998), Giant
 Reggae Remakes (2003), Pony Canyon
 Big Mountain's Greatest Moments 1999–2004 (2004), Pony Canyon
 Versions Undercover (2008), Rebel Ink Records

Singles

References

Musical groups from San Diego
American reggae musical groups
Musical groups established in 1988
1988 establishments in California